CKWW (580 AM) is a Canadian radio station in Windsor, Ontario. It is owned by Bell Media and airs an oldies format targeted to the Windsor/Detroit market. Most of the playlist is made up of hits from the 1950s, 60s and 70s. The studios and offices are on Ouellette Avenue in Windsor.

CKWW's transmitter is on Concession Road 4N in Amherstburg, Ontario. The station is powered at 500 watts, using a directional antenna to protect other Canadian and U.S. stations broadcasting on 580 AM. CKWW streams its programming live on its website and on the iHeartRadio platform.

History
The original applicant for the CKWW licence was Royce Frith (later to be a Canadian Senator). But Frith sold the station to Geoff Stirling before it went to air. The station was launched by Stirling on March 29, 1964, signing on the air on March 30, 1964.

Initially CKWW featured a middle of the road (MOR) or "good music" format with a heavy news and information commitment, making it the Windsor equivalent of Detroit's WJR. The morning host was Norm Aldred, with news delivered by Stan Switzer and sports with Al Shaver (who was also the station manager). Other disc jockeys included Ron Burgoyne in the afternoons and Richard "Dick" Gasparini hosting an all-night program called "Music 'til Dawn," at one point totally sponsored by a well-known tobacco company. Popular recording artists featured on a regular basis included Frank Sinatra, George Shearing, Peggy Lee, Andy Williams, Nat King Cole, The Four Freshmen and Barbra Streisand.

In 1967, sister station CKWW-FM was launched (later CJOM and now CIMX-FM). Stirling sold the stations in 1984, and the station dropped its MOR music programming to adopt a news/talk format in 1989.

In February 1993, CHUM Limited acquired CKLW and CKLW-FM as well. CKLW (by then a "Music of Your Life" adult standards station) and CKWW swapped formats on March 1 of that year, with CKLW becoming the news/talk outlet and CKWW adopting the adult standards format.

As an oldies station
In 2005, CKWW changed its on-air moniker from 580 Memories to AM 580 Motor City Favorites. It dropped all jingles and added more uptempo hits from the 1960s through 1990s plus some adult contemporary chart recurrents while dropping most of its pre-1960 titles, in an attempt to appeal to a younger audience. The change in the music proved largely unpopular with fans of the old standards format.

In October 2006, in response to 104.3 WOMC eliminating the word "oldies" from its on-air positioning, CKWW revamped its playlist once more to focus primarily on music from the late 1950s through the late 1970s while dropping all post-1980 material. CKWW now plays many of the oldies hits originally heard during the Top 40 era of CKLW, then known as The Big 8. Although still known as AM 580, Motor City Favorites, the station returned jingles to its on-air presentation and added the taglines "Great Fun! Great Oldies!" and "All Oldies, All the Time" to its slogans.

AM 580 plays up its connections to Windsor/Detroit's Top 40 radio past on the air, as the station's top-of-the-hour identification mentions that the station "broadcasts from the legendary studios of "The Big 8" (at 1640 Ouellette Avenue in Windsor) and also features the widely recognized instrumental signature tunes from CKLW's glory years.

In 2007 CKWW along with the other CHUM stations were sold to CTVglobemedia. In 2011, CTVglobemedia was acquired by Bell Media.

In June 2012, CKWW began airing the syndicated American Top 40 - The 70s with Casey Kasem from 7-10 p.m. on Sundays and Tuesdays, but scaled it back in mid-2013 to a once-weekly broadcast in the Sunday evening time slot. Other weekend specialty programming includes Breakfast with The Beatles, Money Matters, Elvis Only!, Shake, Rattle, Showtime and the Sunday Oldies Show. In the spring of 2020, Roger Ashby Oldies Show was added to the weekly program list, airing on Saturday mornings. In addition, CKWW also has Back to the 70's with host M.G. Kelly, airing on Saturday nights; Live from the 60s rebroadcasts with the Real Don Steele, airing on Friday nights; and Breakfast With the Beatles with host Dennis Mitchell, airing on Sunday mornings.

See also 
Media in Detroit

References

External links
AM 580, Motor City Favorites

Radio-Locator Information for CKWW-AM

KWW
KWW
KWW
Radio stations established in 1964
1964 establishments in Ontario